Ekaterina Viktorovna Pushkash (born 27 May 1992) is a Russian ice dancer. With partner Jonathan Guerreiro, she is the 2011 World Junior silver medalist and 2011 Russian Junior silver medalist.

Early career 
Ekaterina Pushkash originally trained in ballroom dancing and took up ice dancing because of her cousin. She teamed up with her maternal first cousin, Dmitri Kiselev, in 2000. They moved from Nizhny Novgorod to Moscow for training in 2002. Pushkash/Kiselev won silver medals at the 2008–2009 ISU Junior Grand Prix event in Gomel, Belarus and at the 2009 Russian Junior Championships. They finished sixth at the 2009 World Junior Championships and parted ways at the end of the season.

Partnership with Guerreiro

Junior career 
Coaches Irina Zhuk and Alexander Svinin suggested she skate with Jonathan Guerreiro. She was reluctant at first, not wishing to cause family problems, but eventually agreed.

She and Jonathan Guerreiro began skating together in May 2009. They finished 5th at the 2009–2010 Junior Grand Prix Final and won the bronze medal at the 2010 Russian Junior Championships. At the end of the season, they switched coaches to Natalia Linichuk and Gennadi Karponossov, which required them to move to Aston, Pennsylvania in the United States.

During the 2010–2011 season, they finished 4th at the JGP Final. At the 2011 Russian Junior Championships, they won the silver medal and were assigned to the World Junior Championships where they won the silver medal.

Senior career 
Pushkash and Guerreiro moved up to the senior level for the 2011–2012 season. Guerreiro fractured his left foot in training in June 2011, causing them to miss a few weeks of training. They competed at two Grand Prix events, 2011 Skate Canada and 2011 Cup of Russia. At the end of the season, they changed coaches to Nikolai Morozov in Moscow.

Prior to the 2013–14 season, Pushkash and Guerreiro began training with Anjelika Krylova and Pasquale Camerlengo in Bloomfield Hills, Michigan.

Personal life 
Pushkash and Dmitri Kiselev are first cousins – their mothers are sisters. Her father is a former competitive marathon runner.

Programs

With Guerreiro

With Kiselev

Competitive highlights

With Guerreiro

With Kiselev

References

External links 

 
 

Russian female ice dancers
1992 births
Living people
World Junior Figure Skating Championships medalists
Sportspeople from Nizhny Novgorod